Marianela Szymanowski Alonso (born 31 July 1990) is an Argentine footballer who plays as a forward for Spanish Primera División club RCD Espanyol and the Argentina women's national team.

Playing career
Szymanowski began playing football with the small Madrid suburban club Rayo Ciudad Alcobendas Club de Futbol from age 11 to 18. She then moved to  Atlético Madrid, where she debuted in Primera División and in the Champions League with the club. She previously played for Atlético Madrid.

After two years, Szymanowski left Atlético and signed with Rayo Vallecano, where she would play during five seasons before signing with Valencia.

In 2011, she suffered an injury that forced her to provisionally retire until 2013.

International career
Szymanowski played for Argentina in the 2014 Copa América Femenina.

Personal life
Her brother Alexander who played in La Liga for CD Leganés. Their paternal grandparent was a Pole born in 1923 in what is now Ukraine, who moved to Argentina at the age of five, and a Russian woman.

References
Notes

Citations

External links 
 Rayo Vallecano profile
 Marianela Szymanowski at FutbolEsta.com 

1990 births
Living people
Footballers from Buenos Aires
Argentine people of Polish descent
Argentine people of Russian descent
Argentine women's footballers
Women's association football forwards
Primera División (women) players
Atlético Madrid Femenino players
Rayo Vallecano Femenino players
Valencia CF Femenino players
Real Betis Féminas players
Argentina women's international footballers
Argentine expatriate women's footballers
Argentine expatriate sportspeople in Spain
Expatriate women's footballers in Spain